Simon Parker (born 6 May 2000 in New Zealand) is a New Zealand rugby union player who plays for the  in Super Rugby. His playing position is flanker. He has signed for the Chiefs for the Super Rugby Aotearoa competition.

Reference list

External links
itsrugby.co.uk profile

2000 births
New Zealand rugby union players
Living people
Rugby union flankers
Waikato rugby union players
Chiefs (rugby union) players